Thiruneelakantar is a 1939 Indian Tamil-language film directed by Raja Sandow and starring M. K. Thyagaraja Bhagavathar. The film, based on the life of Tirunilakanta Nayanar, was a big hit and was known for Thyagaraja Bhagavathar's acting apart from his songs. The noted nadaswaram player T. N. Rajarathinam Pillai makes a guest appearance.

Cast 
M. K. Thyagaraja Bhagavathar as Thiruneelakantar
Sirukalathur Sama as Siva Yogi
Thirunelveli Papa as Neelaya Thatchi
N. S. Krishnan as Chokan
T. A. Mathuram as Bommi
T. S. Durairaj
R. Balasaraswathi as Saraswathi
S. S. Rajamani as Kalavathi

Soundtrack 
Soundtrack was composed by Papanasam Sivan. The song "Dheena Karunakaraney" was well received and became a cult classic. The song Pavazhamaal is a Thiruvisaippa composed by Thiruvaliyamudhanar. T. N. Rajarathnam Pillai set the tune for this in the raga Nattai.

Release 
Randor Guy of The Hindu wrote "Remembered for MKT’s scintillating songs and the comedy by NSK-TAM."

References

Notes

External links 
 
  (in public domain in India)

1930s biographical films
1930s Tamil-language films
1939 films
Hindu devotional films
Hindu mythological films
Indian biographical films
Films scored by Papanasam Sivan
Indian black-and-white films